Ingres Database is a proprietary SQL relational database management system intended to support large commercial and government applications.

Actian Corporation, which announced April 2018 that it is being acquired by HCL Technologies, controls the development of Ingres and makes certified binaries available for download, as well as providing worldwide support. There was an open source release of Ingres but it is no longer available for download from Actian. However, there is a version of the sourcecode still available on GitHub.

In its early years, Ingres was an important milestone in the history of database development. Ingres began as a research project at UC Berkeley, starting in the early 1970s and ending in 1985. During this time Ingres remained largely similar to IBM's seminal System R in concept; it differed in more permissive licensing of source code, in being based largely on DEC machines, both under
UNIX and VAX/VMS, and in providing QUEL as a query language instead of SQL. QUEL was considered at the time to run truer to Edgar F. Codd's relational algebra (especially concerning composability), but SQL was easier to parse and less intimidating for those without a formal background in mathematics. 

When ANSI preferred SQL over QUEL as part of the 1986 SQL standard (SQL-86), Ingres became less competitive against rival products such as Oracle until future Ingres versions also provided SQL. Many companies spun off of the original Ingres technology, including Actian itself, originally known as Relational Technology Inc., and the NonStop SQL database originally developed by Tandem Computers but now offered by Hewlett Packard Enterprise.

Early history
Ingres began as a research project at the University of California, Berkeley, starting in the early 1970s and ending in 1985. The original code, like that from other projects at Berkeley, was available at minimal cost under a version of the BSD license. Ingres spawned a number of commercial database applications, including Sybase, Microsoft SQL Server, NonStop SQL and a number of others.

Postgres (Post Ingres), a project which started in the mid-1980s, later evolved into PostgreSQL. It is ACID compatible and is fully transactional (including all DDL statements) and is part of the Lisog open-source stack initiative.

1970s
In 1973 when the System R project was getting started at IBM, the research team released a series of papers describing the system they were building. Two scientists at Berkeley, Michael Stonebraker and Eugene Wong, became interested in the concept after reading the papers, and started a relational database research project of their own.

They had already raised money for researching a geographic database system for Berkeley's economics group, which they called Ingres, for INteractive Graphics REtrieval System. They decided to use this money to fund their relational project instead, and used this as a seed for a new and much larger project. They decided to re-use the original project name, and the new project became University INGRES. For further funding, Stonebraker approached the DARPA, the obvious funding source for computing research and development at the time, but both the DARPA and the Office of Naval Research (ONR) turned them down as they were already funding database research elsewhere. Stonebraker then introduced his idea to other agencies, and, with help from his colleagues he eventually obtained modest support from the NSF and three military agencies: the Air Force Office of Scientific Research, the Army Research Office, and the Navy Electronic Systems Command.

Thus funded, Ingres was developed during the mid-1970s by a rotating team of students and staff. Ingres went through an evolution similar to that of System R, with an early prototype in 1974 followed by major revisions to make the code maintainable. Ingres was then disseminated to a small user community, and project members rewrote the prototype repeatedly to incorporate accumulated experience, feedback from users, and new ideas. The research project ended in 1985.

Commercialization (1980s)
Ingres remained largely similar to IBM's System R in concept, but it was based largely on DEC machines, both under
UNIX

Unlike System R, the Ingres source code was available (on tape) for a nominal fee. By 1980 some 1,000 copies had been distributed, primarily to universities. Many students from U.C. Berkeley and other universities who used the Ingres source code worked on various commercial database software systems.

Berkeley students Jerry Held and later Karel Youseffi moved to Tandem Computers, where they built a database system that evolved into NonStop SQL. The Tandem database system was a re-implementation of the Ingres technology. It evolved into a system that ran effectively on parallel computers; that is, it included functionality for distributed data, distributed execution, and distributed transactions (the last being fairly difficult). Components of the system were first released in the late 1970s. By 1989, the system could run queries in parallel and the product became fairly famous for being one of the few systems that scales almost linearly with the number of processors in the machine: adding a second CPU to an existing NonStop SQL server will almost exactly double its performance. Tandem was later purchased by Compaq, which started a re-write in 2000, and now the product is at Hewlett-Packard Enterprise.

In the early 1980s, Ingres competed head-to-head with Oracle. The two products were widely regarded as the leading hardware-independent relational database implementations; they had comparable functionality, performance, market share, and pricing, and many commentators considered Ingres to be a (perhaps marginally) superior product. From around 1985, however, Ingres steadily lost market share. One reason was Oracle's aggressive marketing; another was the increasing recognition of SQL as the preferred relational query language. Ingres originally had provided a different language, QUEL, and the conversion to SQL (delivered in Ingres version 6) took about three years, losing valuable time in the race.

Robert Epstein, the chief programmer on the project while he was at Berkeley, formed Britton Lee, Inc. along with other students from the Ingres Project, Paula Hawthorn and Michael Ubell; they were joined later by Eric Allman. Later, Epstein founded Sybase. Sybase had been the #2 product (behind Oracle) for some time through the 1980s and into the 1990s, before Informix came "out of nowhere" and took over in 1997. Sybase's product line had also been licensed to Microsoft in 1992, who rebranded it as Microsoft SQL Server. This relationship soured in the late 1990s, and today SQL Server outsells Sybase by a wide margin.

Relational Technologies Inc
Several companies used the Ingres source code to produce products. The most successful was a company named Relational Technology, Inc. (RTI), founded in 1980 by Stonebraker and Wong, and another Berkeley professor, Lawrence A. Rowe. RTI was renamed Ingres Corporation in the late 1980s. The company ported the code to DEC VAX/VMS, which was the commercial operating system for DEC VAX computers. They also developed a collection of front-end tools for creating and manipulating databases (e.g., reporterwriters, forms entry and update, etc.) and application development tools. Over time, much of the source was rewritten to add functionality (for example, multiple-statement transactions, SQL, B-tree access method, date/time datatypes, etc.) and improve performance (for example, compiled queries, multithreaded server).  The company was purchased by ASK Corporation in November 1990.  The founders left the company over the next several months. In 1994, ASK/Ingres was purchased by Computer Associates, who continued to offer Ingres under a variety of brand names (for example, OpenIngres, Ingres II, or Advantage Ingres).

In 2004, Computer Associates released Ingres r3 under an open source license. The code includes the DBMS server and utilities and the character-based front-end and application-development tools.  In essence, the code has everything except OpenROAD, the Windows 4GL GUI-based development environment.
In November 2005, Garnett & Helfrich Capital, in partnership with Computer Associates, created a new company called Ingres Corporation, which provided support and services for Ingres, OpenROAD, and the connectivity products.

Recent years
In February 2006, Ingres Corporation released Ingres 2006 under the GNU General Public Licence.
Ingres 9.3 was released on October 7, 2009. It was a limited release targeted at new application development on Linux and Windows only.

Ingres 10 was released on October 12, 2010,  as a full release, supporting upgrade from earlier versions of the product. It was available on 32-bit and 64-bit Linux, and 32-bit Microsoft Windows.

Open-source community initiatives with Ingres included:

Community Bundles – Alliances with other open-source providers and projects, such as Alfresco, JasperSoft, Hibernate, Apache Tomcat, and Eclipse, enable Ingres to provide its platform and technology with other open-source technologies.

Established by Ingres and Carleton University, a series of Open Source Boot Camps were held in 2008 to work with other open-source communities and projects to introduce university and college students and staff to the concepts and realities of open source.

Other involvement includes: Global Ingres University Alliances, Ingres Engineering Summit, Ingres Janitors Project and several memberships in open-source initiatives.

Ingres Icebreaker is an appliance that combines the Ingres Database with the Linux operating system, enabling people to simultaneously deploy and manage a database and operating system.

Ingres CAFÉ (Consolidated Application Foundation for Eclipse), created by a team of developers at Carleton University, is an integrated environment that helps software architects accelerate and simplify Java application development.

Ingres Geospatial was community-based project to create industry-standards-compliant geospatial storage features in the Ingres DBMS. In other words, for storing map data and providing powerful analysis functions within the DBMS.

In November 2010 Garnett & Helfrich Capital acquired the last 20% of equity in Ingres Corp that it did not already own.

Actian
On September 22, 2011, Ingres Corporation became Actian Corporation. It focused on Action Apps, which use Ingres or Vectorwise RDBMS systems.

Postgres 

The Postgres project was started in the mid 1980s to address limitations of existing database-management implementations of the relational model. Primary among these was their inability to let the user define new domains (or "types") which are combinations of simpler domains (see relational model for an explanation of the term "domain"). The project explored other ideas including the incorporation of write-once media (e.g., optical disks), the use of massive storage (e.g., never delete data), inferencing, and object-oriented data models.  The implementation also experimented with new interfaces between the database and application programs (e.g., "portals", which are sometimes referred to as "fat cursors").

The resulting project, named "Postgres", aimed at introducing the minimum number of features needed to add complete types support. These included the ability to define types, but also the ability to fully describe relationships – which up until this time had been widely used but maintained entirely by the user. In Postgres, the database "understood" relationships, and could retrieve information in related tables in a natural way using rules.

In the 1990s, Stonebraker started a new company to commercialize Postgres, under the name Illustra. The company and technology were later purchased by Informix Corporation.

Actian X - The new Ingres
Ingres 11 was released on 18 April 2017 and is now known as Actian X Hybrid Database.

See also

Applications-By-Forms
Comparison of relational database management systems
List of relational database management systems

References

External links
The Design and Implementation of INGRES
Retrospection on a Database System
Ingres FAQ (from 1997)
Actian Corp.
University INGRES,Version 8.9

Client-server database management systems
Cross-platform software
Free database management systems
Relational database management systems